Brian Potter may refer to:

 Brian Potter (character), a fictional character played by Peter Kay
 Brian Potter (musician), British-born American pop music songwriter and record producer
 Brian Potter (footballer) (born 1977), former Scottish footballer